The P'yŏngnam Line is an electrified standard-gauge trunk line of the Korean State Railway in North Korea, linking P'yŏngyang with the port city of Namp'o and the hot springs at P'yŏngnam Onch'ŏn.

The P'yŏngnam Line serves as a connection between the various trunk lines starting at P'yŏngyang that serve the north and east of the country with the lines in the southwestern part of North Korea by means of a connection to the Sŏhae Kammun Line (West Sea Barrage Line). It connects to the Ryonggang Line and the Taean Line, as well as to the P'yŏngyanghwajŏn Line, the Chamjilli Line, the Posan Line, the Tojiri Line, the Namp'o Port Line, and, formerly, the Namdong Line.

History
The P'yŏngnam Line was originally built as two separate lines by two separate railway companies - the P'yŏngnam Line built by the Chosen Government Railway (Sentetsu), and the Onch'ŏn Line built by the privately owned Chosen P'yŏngan Railway.

P'yŏngnam Line, 1909–1945
In September 1909, Sentetsu began construction of a rail line running between P'yŏngyang and Chinnamp'o (nowadays Namp'o). Called the P'yŏngnam Line, it was opened for operations on 16 October 1910.

Onch'ŏn Line, 1938–1945
On 8 July 1938, the Chosen P'yŏngan Railway opened the  Onch'ŏn Line from Chinnamp'o, terminus of Sentetsu's P'yŏngnam Line, to Ryonggang Onch'ŏn, running two daily passenger trains to connect the hot springs there with Pot'onggang Station in P'yŏngyang and with Tŏkch'ŏn on the West Chosen Central Railway's Seoseon Line.

Since 1945
After the partition of Korea, the two lines were within the Soviet zone of occupation, and both lines - together with all others within the Soviet zone - were nationalised by the Provisional People’s Committee for North Korea on 10 August 1946, and operated by the  Korean State Railway following the establishment of the DPRK, which merged the Onch'ŏn Line into the P'yŏngnam Line. The line was heavily damaged during the Korean War, but was subsequently rebuilt and expanded, with the construction of Sinnamp'o Station to serve glass factories and shipbuilders located there.

The mainline between P'yŏngyang and Namp'o was electrified in December 1979.

After the completion of the West Sea Barrage in 1986, a new rail line, the Sŏhae Kammun Line was opened, running from Sillyŏngri on the P'yŏngnam Line to Ch'ŏlgwang on the Ŭnnyul Line.

Modernisation
On 21 October 2014 a groundbreaking ceremony for the Sŭngri ("Victory") project to modernise the P'yŏngnam Line from Namp'o to P'yŏngyang and the P'yŏngdŏk Line from P'yŏngyang to Chaedong was held.

The overall project cost is estimated to be around US $25 billion, and it is expected that exports of coal, rare-earth and non-ferrous metals from the DPRK to Russia will provide the funding for the project.

Services

Freight
A wide array of industries along the mainline of the P'yŏngnam Line are all served by freight trains, and import-export traffic through Namp'o Port - North Korea's largest in terms of traffic - is also moved by rail along this line.

The Ch'ŏllima Steel Complex at Kangsŏn, the DPRK's largest steel mill, produces steel and other alloys; a good portion of this output is sent to industries elsewhere on the P'yŏngnam Line.

The Kŭmsŏng Tractor Factory at Kangsŏ produces tractors and other agricultural equipment for both domestic use and export, using structural steel supplied from the Sŏngjin Steel Works and the Ch'ŏllima Steel Complex and plate steel from the Hwanghae Iron & Steel Complex.

All freight heading to and from the Taean Machine Complex located in Taean on the adjoining Taean Line moves via the P'yŏngnam Line. Steel arrives there from the Kimchaek Iron & Steel Complex, the Hwanghae Iron & Steel Complex and the Ch'ŏllima Steel Complex, nonferrous metals from the Munp'yŏng Smelter, and imported materials and parts unloaded from ships at Namp'o Port.

There is a significant amount of short-distance freight traffic between Kangsŏn and the Posan Line via Kangsŏ: the April 13 Ironworks, located at Posan, produces pig iron that is all shipped to the Ch'ŏllima Steel Complex; the ironworks receives some of its raw material via rail, as well.

Other rail-served industries on the line include, among others, the P'yŏngyang Wheat Flour Factory at Ch'ilgol in Samhŭng-dong, Man'gyŏngdae-guyŏk in P'yŏngyang; and the Pyeonghwa Motors factory and the Ch'ŏnji Lubricant Factory at Sinnamp'o. There are also numerous rail-served factories on the connecting lines.

The section from Sinnamp'o to  P'yŏngnam Onch'ŏn serves a primarily agricultural area. There are freight loading facilities at East Kwangryang, Rosang, Kwisŏng and P'yŏngnam Onch'ŏn. The bulk of outbound freight traffic on this section is salt and agricultural products; inbound traffic consists primarily of coal, anthracite, fertiliser and goods for everyday use. There is also a significant amount of military traffic along this line, destined for the Onch'ŏn air base of the Korean People's Army Air Force just north of P'yŏngnam Onch'ŏn.

Passenger

A number of long-distance and local passenger trains run along the P'yŏngnam Line, serving the city of Namp'o as well as the hot springs at P'yŏngnam Onch'ŏn.

Four passenger trains operate over the entirety of the mainline. These are semi-express trains 146-147/148-149 between Sinŭiju Ch'ŏngnyŏn on the P'yŏngŭi Line and Namp'o via P'yŏngyang; regional trains 226-227/228-229 between Tŏkch'ŏn on the P'yŏngdŏk Line and P'yŏngnam Onch'ŏn; regional trains 225/230 between Potonggang and P'yŏngnam Onch'ŏn; and regional trains 240-241/242-243 between Haeju Ch'ŏngnyŏn on the Hwanghae Ch'ŏngnyŏn Line and Namp'o via P'yŏngyang.

Other passenger trains on the line include local trains 361/362, operating between Namp'o and Ch'ŏlgwang, running from Namp'o to Sillyŏngri and continuing to Ch'ŏlgwang via the Sŏhae Kammun Line, and local trains 733/734, operating between Kangsŏ and Mayŏng on the Ryonggang Line via Ryonggang.

Due to the poor state of the tracks, as of 2007 the travel time for trains between P'yŏngyang and Namp'o was around three hours; in comparison, in 1920 the six daily trips between P'yŏngyang and Namp'o took 1 hour 40 minutes each way.

Route
A yellow background in the "Distance" box indicates that section of the line is not electrified.

References
 Japanese Government Railways, 鉄道停車場一覧. 昭和12年10月1日現在 [The list of the Stations as of 1 October 1937], Kawaguchi Printing Company, Tokyo, 1937, pg. 486

Railway lines in North Korea
Standard gauge railways in North Korea